The Meese Report (named for Edwin Meese), officially the Final Report of the Attorney General's Commission on Pornography, is the result of an investigation into pornography ordered by U.S. President Ronald Reagan. It was published in July 1986 and contains 1,960 pages.

The following people composed the Attorney General's Commission on Pornography (commonly called the Meese Commission):
 Henry E. Hudson, chairman
 Diane D. Cusack
 Park Elliott Dietz
 James Dobson
 Father Bruce Ritter
 Frederick Schauer
 Deanne Tilton-Durfee
 Judith V. Becker
 Ellen Levine
 Edward J. Garcia
 Tex Lezar
 Alan E. Sears

The report is divided into five parts and 35 chapters and details most aspects of the pornography industry, including the history of pornography and the extent of First Amendment protections. The report also documents what the committee found to be the harmful effects of pornography and connections between pornographers and organized crime. The report was criticized by many inside and outside the pornography industry, calling it biased, not credible, and inaccurate. The report along with revised prosecution tactics under Attorney General Meese was effective in reducing pornography markets in some jurisdictions prior to the Internet.

The "Meese Report" was preceded by the report of presidents Lyndon B. Johnson's and Richard Nixon's Commission on Obscenity and Pornography, which was published in 1970 and recommended loosening the legal restrictions on pornography.

Playboy v. Meese
Prior to the Report's release, Meese Commission chairman Alan Sears sent letters on Commission letterhead to the heads of 23 convenience store chains and other companies, declaring that the Commission would find that they were distributors of pornography and threatening that they would be listed as such in the final Report. In fact, the list of purported distributors had been identified by Donald Wildmon, the head of the conservative Christian advocacy organization that later became the American Family Association. The letters triggered several companies to remove common soft-core pornography magazines as Playboy and Penthouse from store shelves. The American Booksellers Association, the Council for Periodical Distributors Associations, the Magazine Publishers of America, and the publishers of Playboy and Penthouse sued, arguing that the letters constituted prior restraint and were forbidden under the First Amendment. The U.S. District Court for the District of Columbia agreed, leading it to admonish the Commission, order it to withdraw the letter, and forbid it to issue any list of retailers in the report.

See also 
 Committee on Obscenity and Film Censorship
 Effects of pornography
 President's Commission on Obscenity and Pornography

References

External links 
Full text via Hathi Trust Digital Library
The Obscene, Disgusting, and Vile Meese Commission Report, by Pat Califia, an essay criticizing The Meese Report
Politics and Pornography: A Comparison of the Findings of the President's Commission and the Meese Commission and the Resulting Response, by David M. Edwards
Porn, Feminism & the Meese Report first published in the  Proletarian Revolution No. 27 (Winter 1987)  by the League for the Revolutionary Party (New York City).
Some Say Meese Report Rates an 'X' by Edwin McDowell (October 21, 1986) New York Times.

United States pornography law
1986 in the United States
1986 documents
Reports of the United States government